William de Beauchamp, 1st Baron Bergavenny, KG (c. 1343 – 8 May 1411) was an English peer.

Beauchamp was the fourth son of Thomas Beauchamp, 11th Earl of Warwick, and Katherine Mortimer. He served under Sir John Chandos during the Hundred Years' War, and was created a Knight of the Garter in 1376. He served as Captain of Calais in 1383.

Upon the death of his first cousin once removed, John Hastings, 3rd Earl of Pembroke, on 30 December 1389, William inherited the lordship of Abergavenny, including Abergavenny Castle. He was summoned to Parliament on 23 July 1392 as "Willilmo Beauchamp de Bergavenny", by which he is held to have become Baron Bergavenny, a barony by writ. In 1399, he was appointed Justiciar of South Wales and Governor of Pembroke. He entailed the castle and Honour of Abergavenny on the issue male of his body, with remainder to his brother Thomas Beauchamp, 12th Earl of Warwick and his heirs male; his wife enjoyed it in dower until her death in 1435. Bergavenny died in 1411 and was buried at Black Friars, Hereford.

Marriage and offspring 
Bergavenny married Lady Joan FitzAlan, daughter of Richard FitzAlan, 11th Earl of Arundel, and Elizabeth de Bohun, and they had the following children:
 Richard de Beauchamp, 1st Earl of Worcester, 2nd Baron Bergavenny (bef. 1397 – 1422), married Isabel le Despenser, daughter of Thomas Despenser, 1st Earl of Gloucester and Constance of York, by whom he had one daughter Elizabeth de Beauchamp, Baroness Bergavenny.
 Joan de Beauchamp (1396 – 3 August 1430), married 28 August 1413 James Butler, 4th Earl of Ormond, son of James Butler, 3rd Earl of Ormond and Anne Welles, by whom she had five children, including Thomas Butler, 7th Earl of Ormond.

Ancestry

Notes

References
 

14th-century births
1411 deaths
Knights of the Garter
William
Peers created by Richard II
Barons Bergavenny (Peerage of England)
Younger sons of earls